60th edition of the tournament. Al-Arabi SC are the defending champions.

Teams

League table

Statistics

Top scorers

References

External links 
 

Kuwait Premier League seasons
Premier League
Kuwaiti Premier League